The South Klang Valley Expressway, or SKVE  (Malay: Lebuhraya Lembah Klang Selatan), is an expressway in the southern part of Klang Valley, Malaysia's most densely populated region. This  dual-carriageway provides links to the booming towns in southern Klang Valley, including the country's administrative capital, Putrajaya. South Klang Valley Expressway is the fifth east–west-oriented expressway in the Klang Valley after the Federal Highway, the New Klang Valley Expressway (NKVE), the Kuala Lumpur–Kuala Selangor Expressway (LATAR) and the Shah Alam Expressway (KESAS).

Route background
The Kilometre Zero of the expressway is located right after the Uniten Interchange at the Kajang Dispersal Link Expressway E18.

History
The first 7.95 km (section 1A) stretch that starts at the UNITEN interchange in Bangi is toll free, and had been open for several years. It was built by the Malaysian Public Works Department (JKR). The section 1B, 2 and 3 stretch of SKVE are to be built by SKVE Holdings Sdn Bhd. The section 1B stretch of the expressway between Cyberjaya to Bandar Saujana Putra was completed in June 2010.

The section 2 stretch of the expressway from Bandar Saujana Putra towards Teluk Panglima Garang measuring 12.96 km long would have been completed in 2011. SKVE’s last stretch is the 18.81 km long section 3 and connects to Pulau Carey before terminating at the Pulau Indah interchange, serving as a direct link between Putrajaya and Westports in Port Klang.

Section 1B of this expressway between Cyberjaya to Bandar Saujana Putra was opened to traffic on 1 July 2010. Meanwhile, the section 2 stretch of the expressway between Bandar Saujana Putra to Teluk Panglima Garang was opened on 29 May 2012 and the final stretch, section 3 of the expressway between Teluk Panglima Garang to Pulau Indah was opened on 1 October 2013.

Features
The section between Teluk Panglima Garang towards Pulau Carey and Pulau Indah is built as a two-lane expressway while retaining the full access control, making the section as the first true two-lane expressway with full access control in the Klang Valley and also the second in Malaysia after the Senai–Desaru Expressway (Cahaya Baru–Penawar sections) in Johor Bahru.

There are three main bridge along the expressway, the Jalan Puchong-Sungai Rasau bridge, the Pulau Carey-Sungai Langat bridge and the Selat Lumut-SKVE Bridge, a major landmark.

A speed camera of the Malaysian Automated Enforcement System (AES) is on SKVE near Shell layby, Serdang.

A runaway truck ramp, to stop vehicles unable to brake, is provided on both ends of the Selat Lumut-SKVE Bridge.

There are two Malaysian Road Transport Department (JPJ) Enforcement Stations at Pulau Carey.

IOI City Mall, the largest shopping mall in Serdang is near IOI Resort.

Criticism
 section 1A of the expressway (toll-free) was in a state of  poor maintenance, with most of its street lights not functioning and wrecked guardrails unreplaced at accident sites.

Toll systems
The South Klang Valley Expressway (SKVE) is using the closed toll system. Since 1 June 2016, all electronic toll transactions have been conducted using Touch 'n Go and SmartTAGs.

Toll plaza abbreviations

Toll rates

Note: Toll charges can only be paid with the Touch 'n Go cards or SmartTAG. Cash payment is not accepted.

List of interchanges

References

External links
 SKVE Holdings Sdn Bhd official website
 SKVE Highway Details, Malaysian Highway Authority

2010 establishments in Malaysia
Expressways and highways in the Klang Valley
Expressways in Malaysia